This is a list of airships with a current unexpired Federal Aviation Administration (FAA) registration.

In 2021, Reader's Digest said that "consensus is that there are about 25 blimps still in existence and only about half of them are still in use for advertising purposes". The Airsign Airship Group is the owner and operator of 8 of these active ships, including the Hood Blimp, DirecTV blimp, and the MetLife blimp.

Goodyear
These airships are registered to the Goodyear Tire & Rubber Company of Akron, Ohio.

AirSign Airships
These airships are registered to AirSign Airships of Williston, Florida.

Icarus Aircraft
These airships are registered to Icarus Aircraft of Palm City, FL:

SCEYE Inc
These airships are registered to SCEYE Inc. of Moriarty, NM as SCEYE Airship:

Other miscellaneous airships
These are other miscellaneous airships from the registry, many of which are unverified to exist or may be mistakenly listed as airships:

References

External links
 Goodyear Blimps
 AirSign
 Icarus Aircraft
 Cloud Lab
 SCEYE
 LTA Research and Exploration LLC

United States
Airships of the United States